Statistics of Dhivehi League in the 2007 season.

Overview
Victory Sports Club won the Dhivehi League. New Radiant SC won the Maldives National Championship.

Promotion/relegation playoff Zone 9 for 2008 Dhivehi League

Final standings

References
RSSSF

Dhivehi League seasons
Maldives
Maldives
1